The following is a list of the 134 municipalities (comuni) of the Metropolitan City of Milan, formerly the Province of Milan, Lombardy, Italy.

List

See also

References

 01
Metropolitan City of Milan
Milan